Pish Khowr District is a district (bakhsh) in Famenin County, Hamadan Province, Iran. At the 2006 census, its population was 4,327, in 1,141 families.  The District is entirely rural. The District has one rural district (dehestan): Pish Khowr Rural District.

References 

Famenin County
Districts of Hamadan Province